The Lechner A-390 was an Olympic Class windsurf board for the 1992 Olympics. It was only raced at the Games that year.

Description
Lechner was modified their Division II to bring the centreboard and mast track further aft. The rig supplier, Neil Pryde, was decided 3 years before the Olympics. 

The supplied equipment stayed with the sailor for the entire regatta as it was expected that each board needed special tuning to the daggerboard system.

References

See also
Lechner A-390 World Championships
Sailing at the 1992 Summer Olympics – Lechner A-390 Men's
Sailing at the 1992 Summer Olympics – Lechner A-390 Women's

 
Windsurfing boards
Olympic sailing classes
Former classes of World Sailing